"Communication" was released as the third single from The Power Station's 1985 debut album. It featured "Communication" (Special Club Mix), "Communication" (Remix) and "Murderess" as the B-side. The remixes were done by Bernard Edwards and Josh Abbey.

The video contained an array of footage showing communication in the world with clips of the band performing the song in the studio.

Track listings 
7" Parlophone / R 6114 (UK)
 "Communication" (7" Remix) - 3:51
 "Murderess" - 4:20

12" Parlophone / 12 R 6114 (UK)
 "Communication" (Special Club Mix) - 4:40
 "Murderess" - 4:20
 "Communication" (7" Remix) - 3:51

12" Capitol / V-15204 (US)
 "Communication" (Special Club Mix) - 4:40
 "Murderess" - 4:20

Chart performance

References

1985 singles
The Power Station (band) songs
Song recordings produced by Bernard Edwards
1985 songs
Songs written by Andy Taylor (guitarist)
Songs written by John Taylor (bass guitarist)
Songs written by Robert Palmer (singer)